The 2012–13 Football Conference season was the ninth season in which the Conference consisted of three divisions and the thirty-third season overall. The Conference covers the top two levels of Non-League football in England. The Conference Premier is the fifth highest level of the overall pyramid, whilst the Conference North and Conference South exist at the sixth level. The Conference was won by Mansfield Town who together with Newport County, the winner of the play-off of the National division, were promoted to Football League Two, while the bottom four were relegated to the North or South divisions. The champions of the North and South divisions were promoted to the National division, alongside the play-off winners from each division. The bottom three in each of the North and South divisions were relegated to the premier divisions of the Northern Premier League, Isthmian League or Southern League.

For sponsorship reasons, the Conference Premier was referred to as the Blue Square Bet Premier.

Conference Premier

A total of 24 teams contested the division, including 18 sides from last season, two relegated from the Football League Two, two promoted from the Conference North and two promoted from the Conference South. The League started on 10 August 2012 with previously relegated Hereford United and Macclesfield Town facing each other at Edgar Street and finished on 20 April 2013 with all matches that day kicking off simultaneously. The 2013 Conference Premier play-off Final on 5 May 2013 was the first Wembley Stadium final to feature two Welsh clubs, Newport County and Wrexham.

Promotion and relegation
Teams promoted from 2011–12 Conference North
 Hyde
 Nuneaton Town

Teams promoted from 2011–12 Conference South
 Woking
 Dartford

Teams relegated from 2011–12 Football League Two
 Macclesfield Town
 Hereford United

League table

Play-offs

First leg

Second leg

Final

Stadia and locations

* Restricted due to stadium expansion or FA ruling.
** Capacity reduced for football matches from maximum capacity of 11,676.
*** Groundshare from 15 February 2013.

 Capacity was temporarily raised to 7,012 for the play-off tie against Grimsby Town

Results

Top scorers

Conference North

A total of 22 teams competed in the division, including 18 sides which competed in the Conference North the previous season, two promoted from the Southern Football League and two from the Northern Premier League.

Promotion and relegation
Teams promoted from 2011–12 Northern Premier League Premier Division
 Chester
 Bradford Park Avenue

Teams promoted from 2011–12 Southern League Premier Division
 Brackley Town
 Oxford City

League table

Play-offs

First leg

Second leg

Final

Stadia and locations

Results

Top scorers

Conference South

A total of 22 teams competed in the division, including 18 sides which competed in the Conference South the previous season, two relegated from the Conference Premier and two promoted from the Isthmian Premier League.

Promotion and relegation
Teams promoted from 2011–12 Isthmian League Premier Division
 Billericay Town
 AFC Hornchurch

Teams relegated from 2011–12 Conference Premier
 Bath City
 Hayes & Yeading United

League table

Play-offs

First leg

Second leg

Final

Stadia and locations

Results

Top scorers

References

 
National League (English football) seasons
5

Eng